The "Bonnie Blue flag" was a banner associated at various times with the Republic of Texas, the short-lived Republic of West Florida, and the Confederate States of America at the start of the American Civil War in 1861. It consists of a single, five-pointed white star on a blue field. Its first use being as early as 1810, it is considered the first lone star flag in U.S. history.

History

The first recorded use of this flag (typically with a white star) was in 1810 when it was used to represent the Republic of West Florida, a republic of English-speaking inhabitants in parts of Louisiana east of the Mississippi River who rebelled against the reign of Spanish government and overthrew Spain's district governor, at Baton Rouge. The republic's independence lasted barely three months, dissolved after the annexation of Louisiana's portion of the disputed land to the United States territory acquired in the Louisiana Purchase.

Later referred to as the Burnet flag, it was adopted by the Congress of the Republic of Texas on December 10, 1836. This version consisted of an azure background with a large golden star, inspired by the 1810 flag of the Republic of West Florida. Variants of the Burnet flag with a white star, virtually identical to the Bonnie Blue flag, were also common. Other variants featured the star, of either color, upside down, and/or ringed with the word Texas, with each letter filling one of the gaps of the star (the De Zavala flag). These flags, combined with the flag of the Fredonian Rebellion, are ancestral to the modern flag of Texas.

When the state of Mississippi seceded from the Union in January 1861, a flag bearing a single white star on a blue field was flown from the capitol dome. Harry Macarthy helped popularize this flag as a symbol of independence, writing the popular song "The Bonnie Blue Flag" early in 1861. Some seceding Southern states incorporated the motif of a white star on a blue field into new state flags.

Although the name "Bonnie Blue" dates only from 1861, there is no doubt that the flag is identical with the banner of the Republic of West Florida. In 2006 the state of Louisiana formally linked the name "Bonnie Blue" to the West Florida banner, passing a law designating the Bonnie Blue flag as "the official flag of the Republic of West Florida Historic Region".

The Bonnie Blue flag was used as an unofficial flag during the early months of 1861. It was flying above the Confederate batteries that first opened fire on Fort Sumter, beginning the Civil War. In addition, many military units had their own regimental flags they would carry into battle.

The flag had been carried by the Confederate 3rd Texas Cavalry, and later exhibited as part of the 1936 Texas Centennial Exposition.

In popular culture
In the 1936 novel by Margaret Mitchell and the 1939 film Gone with the Wind, Rhett Butler nicknames his newborn daughter "Bonnie Blue" after Melanie Wilkes remarks that her eyes will be "as blue as the bonnie blue flag."

Both flag and song appear in the film Gods and Generals (2003).

See also
Flags of the Confederate States of America
"The Bonnie Blue Flag" – 1861 song by Irish Ulster-Scots entertainer Harry McCarthy. 
Flag of Somalia – A similar national flag
Flag of Bosnia & Herzegovina
Flag of Kosovo

References

1861 establishments in the Confederate States of America
Confederate States of America
Flags of the Confederate States of America
Historical flags

de:The Bonnie Blue Flag